Zick Zack (German for 'Snip Snip' or 'Zig Zag') is a song by German industrial metal band Rammstein. It was released on 7 April 2022 as the second single from their eighth album, Zeit. The song became Rammstein's fourth No. 1 single in Germany after Zeit.

Content 
"Zick Zack" is about cosmetic operations and the rising desire to need surgery in order to retain one's youth and to maintain an acceptable appearance as one ages.

Music video 
The video depicts the band members performing to a small audience of elderly fans, dressed in stereotypical '80s hair metal band costumes, performing the song, complete with bandaged showgirls, who act as the band's beauticians backstage. All the band members appear in character as having undergone various cosmetic surgeries, or using prosthetics to exaggerate their appearance, from Christoph Schneider wearing a toupée to hide his baldness, Paul Landers having dentures, Richard Kruspe wearing a silicone six pack, to Oliver Riedel tattooing a beard onto his face.

Till Lindemann's character appears heavily botoxed, and throughout the video, his face begins to sag as he performs the song, forcing him and Flake Lorenz's character to leave the stage. Lindemann goes to extreme measures, and attempts to literally piece his botox-filled face back together using a stapler and tape.

At the end after Till leaves the stage, the cat ate the liposuction, much to the horror of one woman.

The video was recorded in Teatr Sabat Małgorzaty Potockiej in Warsaw, Poland and in Tworkowski Hospital in Tworki, Poland.

Promotion 
As part of the promotion for the single, Rammstein issued a press release on April 1, 2022, where they announced that the band had invested in a beauty clinic, in the Mitte District of Berlin. In a now deleted post, the press statement read: “We are happy to reveal a well-kept secret today and announce our early-stage investment in a cutting-edge company: The Zick Zack Beauty Clinic In Berlin...Rammstein are super-excited this project is finally going live. ‘Prettier, bigger, harder’ – become the best version of yourself! Appointments will be available soon!”Social media posts, depicting the band as they looked in the music video for the song began being uploaded from April 3, 2022, promoting the Zick Zack beauty clinic, complete with fake phone number and false advertising slogans (actually lyrics from the song). The Music Video premiered at 18:00 CET on Rammstein's official website.

As further promotion, Rammstein released the CD Single with an exclusive, limited edition magazine that featured images of the band from the music video.

Track listing

Charts

Weekly charts

Year-end charts

References 

2022 singles
German-language songs
Number-one singles in Germany
Rammstein songs
Songs written by Till Lindemann
Songs written by Paul Landers
Songs written by Richard Z. Kruspe
Songs written by Christian Lorenz
Songs written by Oliver Riedel
Songs written by Christoph Schneider
Universal Music Group singles